The Imam Mosa Al Kadhim Grand Mosque is a grand mosque located in the city of Basra, Iraq. Following partial destruction, in 2012 reconstruction of the mosque commenced. The mosque is located near the city of Mishraq and near Hayaniya.

See also

 Islam in Iraq
 List of mosques in Iraq

References

Mosques in Iraq
Buildings and structures in Basra